Taking a Stand in Baton Rouge is a photograph of Ieshia Evans, a nurse from Pennsylvania, being arrested by police officers dressed in riot gear during a protest in Baton Rouge, Louisiana, on 9 July 2016. The protest began in the aftermath of the shooting by police of Alton Sterling and Philando Castile. The image, taken by Jonathan Bachman for Reuters, became a viral phenomenon on social media, described by several media organizations as "iconic", with some comparing the image (and Evans) to the photograph of "Tank Man" in the Tiananmen Square protests of 1989.

Background 
At the protest on July 9, 2016, which followed the shooting of Alton Sterling in Baton Rouge and of Philando Castile in Minnesota by police officers, Ieshia Evans was photographed by Jonathan Bachman for Reuters news agency confronting a line of police in riot gear. The image shows a young woman in a flowing dress standing with her arms crossed facing down a line of heavily armed police while two armored officers rush forward to put her in handcuffs. The photograph became a viral phenomenon on social media.

Evans was attending her first protest when she was arrested, having traveled to Baton Rouge after seeing news coverage of the shooting of Sterling. She was detained, held overnight and released on the evening of the next day.

It was the first protest of Bachman's career. Bachman said that he knew he had a picture that would speak volumes about what was going on, and that just moments before, he had been facing in the opposite direction and only turned around when he heard someone shout to Evans to warn her that she was going to get herself arrested.

Cultural impact 
Multiple media organizations described the image as "iconic". The German television channel n-tv described Evans as the "icon" of the protest. Teju Cole, writing for the New York Times Magazine, said that "in spite of, or because of, its simple narrative, Bachman's photograph became an icon. It joined a small group of other images connected to the Black Lives Matter movement", including images of a man throwing a tear gas canister back at police during a protest in Ferguson, Missouri, after the 2014 shooting of Michael Brown; Bree Newsome taking down a Confederate flag at the South Carolina State House; and activist DeRay Mckesson being arrested in Baton Rouge, also while protesting Sterling's death.

The photograph drew comparisons to images of previous civil rights demonstrations as well as the image of "Tank Man" taken during the Tiananmen Square protests of 1989. Yoni Appelbaum commented for The Atlantic:

Evans was interviewed by Gayle King for CBS This Morning, and the public radio program Studio 360 later commissioned Tracy K. Smith to write a poem on the subject of the image. The photograph was included in The New York Times "The Year in Pictures 2016".

Awards 
Bachman's photograph of Evans standing as the two police officers charge towards her was awarded first prize for Contemporary Issues in the 2017 (60th) World Press Photo Contest.

Ieshia Evans 
Evans, the subject of the photograph, was 35 at the time it was taken. She is originally from Brooklyn and is a licensed practical nurse in Pennsylvania.

In December 2016, Evans met Bachman for the first time at a symposium on news photography organized by Reuters and the International Center of Photography.

Evans was named AfroAmerica Network Black Woman of the Year for 2016 and was chosen to one of the BBC's 100 Women for that year.

After the protest, Evans was critical of the 2016 election candidates, Donald Trump and Hillary Clinton, as well as the former President Barack Obama. She was a vocal critic of the Trump Administration and has stated that she would like to see more whistleblowing due to skepticism surrounding the issues of social justice.

Notes

References

Further reading

 
 
 

Color photographs
Reuters
2016 works
2016 in art
Black Lives Matter art
African-American history in Baton Rouge, Louisiana
2010s photographs
Photographs of protests
BBC 100 Women
People notable for being the subject of a specific photograph